The Gobbler's Knob Fire Lookout is a fire lookout tower in the extreme western region of Mount Rainier National Park at an elevation of . One of four fire lookouts remaining in the park, the lookout is used for visitor services during summer weekends. It was built in 1933. The two-story structure features a balconied lookout on the second level, with storage on the ground level. Cables secured to deadmen keep the lookout from blowing over. The lookout was extensively damaged in a 2006 storm, along with Mount Fremont Fire Lookout. They've since been repaired.

The lookout was placed on the National Register of Historic Places on March 13, 1991. It is part of the Mount Rainier National Historic Landmark District, which encompasses the entire park and which recognizes the park's inventory of Park Service-designed rustic architecture.

References

External links

 Gobbler's Knob Lookout at National Geographic Traveler

Government buildings completed in 1933
Towers completed in 1933
Buildings and structures in Pierce County, Washington
Buildings and structures in Mount Rainier National Park
Fire lookout towers on the National Register of Historic Places in Washington (state)
National Register of Historic Places in Mount Rainier National Park
1933 establishments in Washington (state)